Air Carolina, originally known as Florence Airlines, was a regional airline initially based in Florence, South Carolina, with piston aircraft service within the Carolinas and Georgia.  The company was originally certified as Florence Airlines, on December 5, 1967, by Sheffield P. Wilds, who was the airline's first president.

History
In 1973, Florence Airlines was operating three daily scheduled passenger and cargo flights between Florence, South Carolina, and Charlotte, North Carolina, with a fleet of one Aero Commander 500B and two Piper Cherokee Sixes. Between 1973 and 1976, they also used a Piper Cherokee 140 for pilot training purposes.

By early 1975, William E. Smith had become president of the airline, and had added one Piper Cherokee Arrow to their fleet, but service had been reduced to just twice daily passenger service between Florence (South Carolina) and Charlotte (North Carolina).

On March 30, 1975, the airline began operating under the name "Air Carolina," and served Atlanta, Georgia, Greenwood, South Carolina, Anderson, South Carolina, and Charlotte, North Carolina, using Piper Navajo Chieftains, Britten Norman Islanders, and a single Twin Otter.

By 1981, their passenger service was operating between Charlotte, Hickory, North Carolina, and Florence. Its fleet then consisted of two Piper Navajo Chieftains, one Piper Navajo, one Piper Aztec, one Piper Seneca, and one Piper Lance.

The airline was later absorbed by Atlantis Airlines in 1980.

Destinations
 Gilbert Field (FLO), Florence, South Carolina (from 1973)
 Charlotte Douglas International Airport (CLT), Charlotte, North Carolina (from 1973)
 Atlanta, Georgia (by 1975)
 Greenwood, South Carolina (from March 30, 1975)
 Anderson, South Carolina (by 1975)
 Hickory Regional Airport (HKY), Hickory, North Carolina (by 1981)

Fleet
Over the duration of its operations, Florence Airlines and Air Carolina utilized numerous aircraft, with a preference for Piper Aircraft models:

 1 - Aero Commander 500B
 2 - Piper Cherokee Six
 3 - Piper Navajo Chieftain — N59820, N59982, N27677
 1 - Piper Navajo — N165YS
 1 - Piper Cherokee 140 — N56821
 1 - Britten Norman Islander — N30BN  - STOL capable twin prop
 1 - de Havilland Canada DHC-6 Twin Otter - STOL capable twin turboprop
 1 - Piper Navajo
 1 - Piper Aztec
 1 - Piper Seneca — N55321
 1 - Piper Lance

See also
 List of defunct airlines of the United States

References

External links
 Air Carolina schedules at AirTimes

Defunct regional airlines of the United States
Airlines established in 1967
Airlines disestablished in 1980
1967 establishments in South Carolina
1980 disestablishments in South Carolina
American companies established in 1967
Defunct airlines of the United States
Airlines based in South Carolina